Amir Pazevari was a Babol Mazandarani Iranian poet with numerous works written in the Mazandarani language. He probably lived in the 17th century in the province of Mazandaran (Tabarestan), Iran.

Further reading
 Habib Borjian, 2006, Amir Pazevari (legendary poet of Mazandarani language), University of Minnesota, United States.
 Mohammad Davoudi and Manouchehr Sotoudeh, "correction and Persian translation of Divan-e Amir Pazevari". Resanesh Publishing Group, Tehran, Iran, July 2004.
 "Amir Pazvari" Encyclopædia Iranica Online, www.iranicaonline.org

References

People from Mazandaran Province
Year of birth unknown
Year of death unknown
17th-century Iranian poets